Yari Verschaeren (born 12 July 2001) is a Belgian professional footballer who plays as an attacking midfielder for Anderlecht and the Belgium national team.

Club career
Verschaeren is a youth product from Anderlecht, joining the club at age 9 from Beveren. In 2017, Verschaeren signed his first contract at Anderlecht.

Verschaeren made his first team debut on 25 November 2018 against Sint-Truiden, before being substituted after 78 minutes in a 4–2 away defeat. Four days later, he made his debut in the Europa League against Spartak Trnava. He was subbed on in the 81st minute. On 27 January 2019, he scored his first goal for Anderlecht against KAS Eupen.

International career
Verschaeren made his international debut for Belgium on 9 September 2019, coming on as a late substitute against Scotland in a Euro 2020 qualifier. A month later, he scored his first goal, from a penalty, in Belgium's 9–0 win against San Marino.

Career statistics

Club

International

Scores and results list Belgium's goal tally first, score column indicates score after each Verschaeren goal.

Honours
Anderlecht
Belgian Cup runner-up: 2021–22

References

External links
Profile at the Belgian FA website

2001 births
Living people
Sportspeople from Sint-Niklaas
Footballers from East Flanders
Association football midfielders
Belgian footballers
Belgium international footballers
Belgium youth international footballers
R.S.C. Anderlecht players
Belgian Pro League players